The High Sheriff of Essex was an ancient sheriff title originating in the time of the Angles, not long after the invasion of the Kingdom of England, which was in existence for around a thousand years. On 1 April 1974, under the provisions of the Local Government Act 1972, the title of Sheriff of Essex was retitled High Sheriff of Essex. The high shrievalties are the oldest secular titles under the Crown in England and Wales, their purpose being to represent the monarch at a local level, historically in the shires.

The office was a powerful position in earlier times, as sheriffs were responsible for the maintenance of law and order and various other roles. It was only in 1908 under Edward VII that the lord-lieutenant became more senior than the high sheriff. Since then the position of high sheriff has become more ceremonial, with many of its previous responsibilities transferred to High Court judges, magistrates, coroners, local authorities and the police.

This is a list of sheriffs and high sheriffs of Essex. Prior to 1567 the Sheriff of Essex was also the Sheriff of Hertfordshire.

List of sheriffs

Edmund I
939 AD: Hugh De Lytton, Sheriff of Litton Parish

William I, William II, Henry I, Stephen
 1067–1070: Jacque de Buckland
 Robert FitzWimarc
 Swein
 ?-1072 Ilbert
 1072–c1086 Peter de Valognes
 Edward de Saresburg
 Stephen
 1129 William of Eynesford
 1130 Richard Basset
 1139 Alberie de Vere II, and Richard Basset, Justices of England
 1140-1142 Geoffrey de Mandeville
 1147 Maurice

Henry II
1155 Richard Basset, Alberie de Vere
1156-57 Richard de Luci
1158-63 Maurice de Tiretie
1164 Fuelle de Bovilla
1165-68 Nicolas the Dean
1169 Nicolas the Clerk
1170-81 Robert de Mancell
1182-88 Otho, the son of William

Richard I
1189-90 Otho, the son of William
1191 Geoffrey, the son of Peter
1192-93 Geoffrey, the son of Peter & Richard Heriet
1193 Simon of Pattishall
1194 Geoffrey, the son of Peter & Simon of Pattishall
1195 William Longchamp
1196 William Pointell
1197-98 Hugh de Neville

John
1199-1200 Hugh de Nevill
1201-1203 Richard de Montfichet
1204 Hugh de Nevill
1205-1208 Matthew Mancel
1209-1213 Earl Alberie
1214 Matthew Mancel
1215 Robert Mancel

Henry III
1216 Robert Mancel
1217-18 William Mancel
1219-20 Walter de Verdon
1221-22 Stephen de Segne
1223 Richard d’Argenton
1224-27 William de Cultwarden
1228-31 William de Coleworth
1232 Robert de Waltham
1233 William de Holewell
1234-35 William de Coleworth
1236-37 Peter de Thany
1238 Peter de Thany
 Richard de Gray
1239 Bertram de Criol
1240 John de Watton
1241 John de Watton
1242-44 Richard de Montfichet
1245 Richard de Montfichet
1246-49 William son of Reynald
1250 Richard de Whitland
1251-53 Hery de Helegeton
1254-55 Ralph de Arderne
1256 Thomas Rameden
 Robert Delval
1257-58 Hubert de Montecampo
1259-60 Richard de Thany
1261-62 Mathias Delamar
 William Delamar
1263 Mathias Delamar
 William Delamar
 John Bocking
1264 Nicholas de Espigornel
1265-66 Richard de Suchirch
1267 Richard de Suchirch
 Richard de Herlawe
1268 John de Canimill
1269 Walter de Blummil
1270-71 Walter de Essex

Edward I
1272-1273 Walter de Essex
1274 Thomas de Sandwie
1275-1277 Lawrence de Scaccario
1278 William de Sancto-Claro
1279-1283 Reginald de Ginge
1284 Reginald de Ginge
1285 William de Lambourn
1286 Hugh le Blunt
1287 Hugh le Blunt
1288-1289 Ralph Boxted
1290 Henry Grapinel
1291 Henry Grapinel
1292 (May–Dec) John Grapinel (Carbonel)
1292 (Dec)-1293 William de Grosse
1294-1296 William de Sutton
1297-1298 Simon de Bradenham
1299-1300 John de Lee
1301 William de Harpenden
1302 John de Wenegrave
1303 John de Bassingbourne
1304 John de la Lee
1305 John de la Lee
 John de Bassingbourne
1306 John de Harpesfeld

Edward II
1307 Edward de Baud
1308-09 Alan de Goldingham
1310 Geoffrey de la Lee
1311 John de la Lee
1312 John Aygnel
1313 John Ward
1314-17 Richard de Perrers
1318 John de Doure
1319 Ralph de Gifford
1320 John de Doure
1321 Nicholas Engain
1322-23 Thomas Gobyn
1324-26 Richard de Perrers

Edward III
1327 William Baud
1328-29 Richard de Perrers
1330–31 John de Wanton
1332 John de Hay
1333–1334 Adam Bloy
 William Boyd
1334-39 Sir John de Coggeshall
1340 William Atemore
1341 Richard de Monte Caviso
1342 Henry Garnet
1343-46 Sir John de Coggeshall
1347 Sir John de Coggeshall
 Peter de Boxted
1348 William Bret
 Humphrey de Walden
1349 Peter de Boxted
1350 Thomas Lacy
1351-53 Sir John de Coggeshall
1354 Hugh Fitz-Simon
1355 William de Enefeld
1356-57 Thomas de Chabham
1358-59 Roger de Louth
1360 Hugh Blount
1361 William de Lyre
1362 Guy de Boys
1363 Thomas Fitling
1364 John Jernoun
1365 Thomas de Helpeston
1366 John Oliver
1367 John Oliver
 John Shardelon
1368 John Henxtworth
1369 John Henxtworth
 Roger Keterich
1370 Thomas de Bassingbourn
1371 William Baud
1372 John de Bampton
1373 John Filiol
1374 Edward Fitz-Simons
1375 John Battaile
1376 Robert Fitz-William

Richard II
1377 Robert Goldington
1378 Sir John Fitz-Symond of North Shoebury, Essex
1379 Edward Benstede of Bennington, Hertfordshire
1380 John Sewale
1381 Walter Godmaston
1382 Geoffrey de Dersham
1383 Thomas Bataill of Otes in High Laver, Essex
1384 John Walton
1385 Geoffrey Brockhole
1386-87 John Ruggewyn of Standon, Hertfordshire
1388 Henry English of Wood Ditton, Cambridgeshire
1388 (Dec to Jan) Sir Robert Swinburne of Little Horkesley and Matching, Essex
1389 Sir Walter Attelee of Albury, Hertfordshire
1390 Geoffrey Michale
1391 Sir William Coggleshall of Codham Hall and Coggeshall, Essex (1st term)
1392 Adam Frances
1393 Thomas Coggeshall
1394 Thomas Sampkin
1395-97 William Bateman
1398 Sir Robert Turk of Hitchin, Hertfordshire

Henry IV
1399 (Aug–Sep) John Doreward of Bocking, Essex
1399 (Sep-Nov) Robert Tey of Marks Tey, Essex
1399 Edward Benstede of Bennington, Hertfordshire
1400 Sir John Howard of Stansted Mountfichet (1st term)
1401 Sir William Marney of Layer Marney, Essex
1402 Helming Leget of Black Notley, Essex
1403 Sir Thomas Swinbourn of Little Horkesley and East Mersea, Essex
1404 Sir William Coggleshall of Codham Hall and Coggeshall, Essex (2nd term)
1405 Edward Benstede of Bennington, Hertfordshire
1406 Sir Gerard Braybrooke of Danbury, Essex
1407 Helming Leget of Black Notley, Essex
1408 William Loveney
1409 John Walden
1410 Thomas Aston
1411 Sir William Coggleshall of Codham Hall and Coggeshall, Essex (3rd term)

Henry V
1412 Philip Englefield
1413 Sir John Tyrell of Heron (1st term)
1414 Sir John Howard of Stansted Mountfichet (2nd term)
1415 Sir Thomas de la Barre of Ayot St. Lawrence
1416 Lewis John of West Horndon
1417 Reginald Malyns
1418 Sir John Howard of Stansted Mountfichet (3rd term)
1419 Robert Darcy of Maldon, Essex

Henry VI
1420-21 Lewis John of West Horndon
1422 Sir John Tyrrell of Heron (2nd term)
1423 Sir Maurice Brewyn of South Okington (1st term)
1424 John Barley of Albury, Hertfordshire
1425 John Doreward of Bocking
1426 Conand Aske
1427 Thomas Tyrell of Heron
1428 John Hotoft of Knebworth
1429 Nicholas Richbull
1430 Henry Langley of Rickling
1431 Sir Nicholas Thorley
1432 John Durward
1433 Robert Whytingham of Pendley
1434 Geoffrey Rockyll
1435 Sir Maurice Brewyn of South Okington (2nd term)
1436 Edward Tyrell
1437 Richard Alrede
1438 Robert Whytingham
1439 Richard Witherton
1440 Thomas Tyrell
1441 Ralph Asteley
1442 Nicholas Morley of Hallingbury
1443 John Hende, the elder (d.1461)
1444 Thomas Tyrell of Heron
1445 Thomas Pigott
1446 Thomas Baud of Hadham Hall
1447 John Hende, the elder (d.1461)
1448 George Langham
1449 Geoffrey Rockhill
1450 Philip Boteler of Watton
1451 Thomas Barrington
1452 John Godmanston
1453 Sir Thomas Cobham
1454 Humphrey Bohun
1455 Ralph Bothe
1456 John Hende, the younger (d.1464)
1457 Lewis John
1458 Robert Darcy of Danbury
1459 Thomas Tyrell of Heron

Edward IV
1460 Thomas Ince
1461-62 Thomas Langley
1463 Sir John Clay
1464 Roger Ree
1465 Sir Lawrence Raynsford
1466 Henry Barley
1467 Sir William Pirton
1468 Walter Writell
1469 Ralph Baud – Hadham Hall
1470 Walter Writell
1471 Sir Roger Ree
1472 Alured Cornburgh
1473 John Sturgeon – Hitchin
1474 Richard Flance
1475 Henry Langley
1476 William Green
1477 Alured Cornburgh
1478 John Wode
1479 John Sturgeon – Hitchin
1480 Thomas Tyrell – Heron
1481 John Fortescue
1482 William Say – Broxbourne

Edward V
1483 William Say – Broxbourne

Richard III
1483-84 Sir William Say – Broxbourne
1485 John Sturgeon Esq of Hitchin

Henry VII
1486 (half the year) Sir Robert Percy
1486 Sir John Fortescue, Kt of Hatfield
1487 Henry Marney
1488 Sir William Pyrton
1489 Henry Tey
1490 John Boteler of Watton
1491 Robert Turbeville
1492 John Berfeild
1493 Henry Marney (2nd term)
1494 Sir Richard Fitz-Lewis of West Horndon
1495 Richard Plomer
1496 William Pulter of Hitchin
1497 Robert Newport of Pelham
1498 Thomas Peryent of Digswell
1499 Sir John Verney of Pendley
1500 Sir Roger Wentworth of Codham Hall
1501 Sir Henry Tye
1502 William Pyrton
1503 Humphrey Tyrell of Heron
1504-05 William Skipworth of St Albans
1506 Roger Darcy
1507-08 John Brocket of Hatfield
1509 Humphrey Tyrell of Heron

Henry VIII
1510 John Leventhorpe – Shingey Hall
1511 William Lytton – Knebworth
1512 Anthony Darcy – Danbury
1513 Edward Tyrell – Heron
1514 John Seyntclere
1515 William Fitz-William
1516 Sir John Vere
1517 Thomas Bonham
1518 Sir Thomas Tyrell – Heron
1519 Sir John Cutts
1520 Sir John Vere
1521 Thomas Bonham of Stanway, Essex
1522 Sir Thomas Tey
1523 John Christmas
1524 Henry Barley of Albury, Hertfordshire
1525 Sir John Vere
1526 Thomas Leventhorpe – Shingey Hall
1527 Thomas Bonham of Stanway, Essex
1528 Edward Tyrell – Heron
1529 Sir Giles Capel – Hadham Hall
1530 John Bowles – Wellington
1531 John Brocket – Hatfield
1532 John Smith
1533 Sir Philip Boteler – Watton
1534 Sir Brian Tuke – Hatfield
1535 Sir William West
1536 Thomas Peryent – Digswell
1537 Sir Henry Parker of Furneux Pelham, Hertfordshire
1538 Sir John Raynsford of Bradfield, Essex
1539 John Smith
1540 Sir Philip Boteler – Watton
1541 Sir John Mordaunt of West Horndon, Essex
1542 Ralph Rowlet – St Albans
1543 John Bowles – Wellington
 John Sewster
1544 John Wentworth
1545 Anthony Cooke of Gidea Hall, Essex
1546 Robert Lytton – Knebworth
1547 John Conyngsby – North Mimms

Edward VI
1547 Edward Brocket of Hatfield
1548 John Cock of Broxbourne, Hertfordshire
1549 Sir John Gates – Cheshunt
1550 Sir George Norton
1551 Sir Henry Tyrell – Heron
1552 Sir Thomas Pope – Tittenhanger

Mary
1553 Sir John Wentworth

Philip & Mary
1554 Edward Brocket of Hatfield
1555 William Harris of Cricksea
1556 Sir John Boteler of Watton-at-Stone
1557 Sir Thomas Pope of Tittenhanger
1558 Thomas Mildmay of Moulsham

Elizabeth
1559 Ralph Rowlett of Holywell House, St Albans, Hertfordshire
1560 Edward Capel – Hadham Hall
1561 Sir Thomas Golding
1562 Sir Thomas Barrington
1563 Henry Fortescue of Faulkbourne
1564 William Ayloffe
1565 Robert Chester – Royston
1566 John Brocket of Brocket Hall, Hatfield, Hertfordshire

1567–1600

 From 1567 Sheriffs were Sheriffs of Essex only

1601–1700

1701–1800

1801–1900

1901–1973

List of high sheriffs

1974–1999

2000–present

Notes

References

Whitaker's Almanack, various editions.
London Gazette, annual announcements

Essex
 
Local government in Essex
High Sheriffs of Essex
High Sheriffs of Essex